Valkla is a settlement in Kuusalu Parish, Harju County in northern Estonia.

References

External links 
Satellite map at Maplandia.com

Villages in Harju County